Gussage Saint Michael is a small village in East Dorset, in the south of England. At the 2001 census, the village had a population of 219. Gussage St Michael is tucked off the main A354 as it runs through the Cranborne Chase, ten miles from Blandford Forum and fourteen miles from Salisbury. The nearest public house is the Drovers Inn, a mile down a country lane in the sister village of Gussage All Saints.

See also
Gussage

References

External links

Villages in Dorset